Franciszek Jóźwiak (20 October 1895 – 23 October 1966) was a Polish communist politician, military commander, chief of staff of the People's Guard, the People's Army and the Citizen's Militia as well as deputy chairman of the Council of Ministers of the Polish People's Republic and a long time member of the Politburo of the Polish United Workers' Party.

Early life and military service 
Jóźwiak was born into a peasant family. He was a member of the Polish Military Organisation and joined the Polish Socialist Party in 1912.

When the First World War broke out, Jóźwiak was mobilized into the Imperial Russian Army. However, in 1914, he went over to the side of Austria-Hungary and joined the Polish Legions. In July 1917, he followed the call of Józef Piłsudski and refused to take the oath to the Kaiser of the German Empire and the Central Powers. Until the end of the war, he was interned in Shchiporno concentration camp.

After First World War, Jóźwiak joined the Army of the Second Republic of Poland and participated in the Polish-Soviet War of 1920, but was later demobilized as a non-commissioned officer.

Communist activities 
Jóźwiak joined the Polish Communist Workers' Party in 1921. During the Polish-Soviet War, the Communist Party supported the Soviet Union and many of its members were arrested.  A year later he was detained for the first time and arrested for 18 months in Lublin. In December 1924 he was arrested a second time. He left the prison in December 1926 and managed the work of district committees of the KPP in Lublin, Radom-Kielce and Poznan-Pomerania. In the years 1928–1929, he was under military training in the USSR. In 1931 he became the head of the Military Department of the Central Committee of the KPP, dealing with intelligence for the USSR and communist propaganda in the Polish Army. In April this year, he was arrested for the third time and sentenced to six years' imprisonment. In January 1937 he was imprisoned in Bereza Kartuska. In the same year, Jóźwiak was sentenced to ten years' imprisonment. Until 1939 he was serving a sentence in a prison in Tarnów.

World War 2 and resistance 
After Germany invaded Poland, he was released from prison. Then he remained in the territories of the Soviet occupation and fought alongside Soviet partisans. In May 1941 he became a member of the All-Union Communist Party (Bolsheviks). In 1942, Jóźwiak made his way into Poland and became a member of the leadership of the Polish Workers' Party. He was the secretary of the Central Committee of the PPR and supervised the power structures in the party. From August 1942, he was the chief of staff of the Gwardia Ludowa, and from January 1944, he served as the chief of staff of the Armia Ludowa. He played a prominent role in the communist Polish Resistance. His partisan pseudonym was "Witold".

In the Polish People's Republic 
In the years 1944–1949 he was the first chief commander of the Citizens' Militia and from March 1945 also served as the deputy Minister of Public Security. In April 1946 he was promoted to the rank of Major General. Then he was the president of the Supreme Audit Office, and after its liquidation from 1952 to 1955 he became the Minister of State Control. At the same time, from 1949 to 1952, he was a member of the State Council. In the years 1955–1956 he was deputy prime minister. From 1948 to 1956 he was a member of the Politburo of the Central Committee of the Polish United Workers' Party and chairman of the Central Party Control Commission. He was a member of the National Council, the Legislative Sejm and the Sejm of the People's Republic of Poland of the first term. From 1945 to 1948 he was the president of the Main Board of the Union of Participants in the Armed Struggle for Freedom and Democracy. In the years 1948–1949 he was the president of the Main Board of the Union of Fighters against Fascism and the Hitlerite Invaders for Independence and Democracy, and until 1956 the Union of Fighters for Freedom and Democracy. In November 1949 he became a member of the National Committee for the Celebration of the 70th anniversary of the birth of Joseph Stalin.

Later career and fall from power 
The Polish October undermined the political position of Franciszek Jóźwiak. On 24 October 1956, the day of Władisław Gomułka's speech with the so called "thaw" program, he was removed from the post of deputy chairman of the government and removed from the Politburo.

In the last decade of his life, Jóźwiak did not hold government posts and did not enjoy the same influence in the party leadership. He headed a group of "Natolins" that was the faction of the hardliners of the PUWP who protested against the moderate liberalization of the regime.

Franciszek Jóźwiak died three days after his 71st birthday. He is buried at the Voinsky Powązki cemetery.

Private life and family 
Jóźwiak was married twice. In the years 1942–1956 he was the married to Helena Wolińska, a military prosecutor in political trials, who left him during the de-Stalinization and returned to Włodzimierz Brus, her first husband. Franciszek's brother, Józef Jóźwiak, was a soldier of the 2nd Polish Corps, he fought at Monte Cassino.

References

1895 births
1966 deaths
People from Puławy County
People from Lublin Governorate
Polish military leaders
Polish communists
Polish Workers' Party politicians
Polish United Workers' Party members
Members of the Politburo of the Polish United Workers' Party
Members of the Central Committee of the Polish United Workers' Party
Recipients of the Order of the Cross of Grunwald, 1st class
Recipients of the Order of the Cross of Grunwald
Recipients of the Order of the Builders of People's Poland